Paul Kelver is a 1902 autobiographical novel by Jerome K. Jerome (best known for Three Men in a Boat).

From the novel, a passage which seems to refer to Jerome's coming of age:
Returning home on this particular day of days, I paused upon the bridge, and watched for a while the lazy barges maneuvering their way between the piers. It was one of those hushed summer evenings when the air even of grim cities is full of whispering voices; and as, turning away from the river, I passed through the white toll-gate, I had a sense of leaving myself behind me on the bridge. So vivid was the impression, that I looked back, half expecting to see myself still leaning over the iron parapet, looking down into the sunlit water.

References

External links
Paul Kelver at Project Gutenberg

1902 British novels
British autobiographical novels
Novels by Jerome K. Jerome